First Presbyterian Church is a historic Presbyterian church located at Ann and Bow Streets in Fayetteville, Cumberland County, North Carolina. It was built in 1832, incorporating parts of the brick walls of an earlier (1816) church that burned in 1831. It is a two-story gabled brick building, five bays wide and five wider bays deep. The chancel, portico, steeple and most of the interior woodwork are later additions and replacements. The hexastyle portico and steeple were designed by Hobart Upjohn in 1922.

It was listed on the National Register of Historic Places in 1976.

References

External links
church website

Historic American Buildings Survey in North Carolina
Churches in Fayetteville, North Carolina
Presbyterian churches in North Carolina
Churches on the National Register of Historic Places in North Carolina
Federal architecture in North Carolina
Churches completed in 1816
19th-century Presbyterian church buildings in the United States
National Register of Historic Places in Cumberland County, North Carolina
1816 establishments in North Carolina